Sedation dentistry refers to the use of pharmacological agents to calm and relax a patient prior to and during a dental appointment.  The pharmacological agents usually belong to a class of drugs called sedatives, which exert their action by depressing the central nervous system, specifically those areas concerned with conscious awareness.

There are different degrees of central nervous system depression, each corresponding to a level of relaxation which ranges from minimal, moderate, to deep sedation.  In general, minimal sedation refers to a patient who has reduced anxiety but readily responds to verbal or physical stimulation.  With moderate sedation the patient is even more relaxed, and will respond to purposeful stimulation.  In deep sedation, the patient may not exhibit any signs of consciousness and therefore be unresponsive to stimulation.

Sedation by pharmacologic methods may be obtained by two general routes.  The enteral route involves absorption of medication across enteric membranes which line the alimentary canal from the oral cavity, through the digestive tract, ending in the rectum.  This route includes medications that are either swallowed, absorbed through the mucosa of the oral cavity, or inserted rectally.  The parenteral route involves the administration of sedative drugs other than absorption across enteric membranes (outside of the alimentary canal).  These methods include intravenous, inhalation, intramuscular, and submucosal administration, among others.

Sedation for children 
Although researchers are calling for further studies to be carried out, current research indicates that oral midazolam is a useful sedative drug for  pediatric patients. Nitrous oxide inhalation has also proven to be useful method to treat anxious children.

References

Dentistry
Sedatives